Ali Abdoh was an Iranian boxer and founder of Persepolis F.C., one of the major teams in Iran. He was Chairman of Persepolis F.C. from 1963 to 1975.

Early life
He was born in 1928 in Persia. He was son of Mohammad Abdoh Boroujerdi who was a chief justice and expert in Islamic law in the Reza Shah era. He was also brother of Jalal Abdoh who was Iran's Ambassador to India and Italy and to the United Nations. Jalal Abdoh was also one of the members of the team that argued Iran's case against the British at the Hague for nationalization of its oil during the Mossadegh era.

Career
Abdo returned to Iran from the United States and was a championship boxer. He founded Persepolis Sports Club in 1963, which is also made up of a basketball team, volleyball team and most importantly the famous football team, Persepolis F.C.

Persepolis F.C. today is one of the most successful and popular Iranian football clubs.

Bowling Abdoh, the club's original headquarters still exists today on Shariati Avenue as the Shahid Chamran Sports and Cultural Complex.

External links

1928 births
1980 deaths
Persepolis F.C.
Iranian male boxers
Iranian expatriates in the United States
20th-century Iranian people